Benki Birugali (Fire and Storm) is a 2013 Indian Kannada action comedy film directed and produced by S. K. Basheed. It was his debut in Kannada cinema as a lead actor. The film also has Rishi, Kadhal Sandhya, Rekha, Monica, Banu Mehra, "Bullet" Prakash, Layendra and Janardhan. K. S. Cheluvaraj was the cinematographer and M. M. Srilekha composed the music. The film was announced in January 2011. It was shot at various locations in Karnataka and Andhra Pradesh.

Benki Birugali was released on 26 April 2013. The film was supposed to be originally a bilingual – Telugu and Kannada – however, the Telugu version was not released. The film released to negative reviews.

Cast
 Rishi as Chandu
 S. K. Basheed as Daya
 Namitha as Mona
 Sandhya as Sandhya
 Rekha Vedavyas as Rekha
 Rishika Singh
 Bhanu Sri Mehra
 Saloni Aswani
 Bullet Prakash
 Layendra
 Bank Janardhan

References

External links 

2013 films
2010s Kannada-language films
Indian action comedy films
2013 action comedy films
2013 comedy films